SRG can refer to:

 SRG Global, Inc., U.S.A., plastic parts manufacturer
 Swiss Broadcasting Corporation (SRG SSR)
 St Richard Gwyn Catholic High School, Flint
 Special Republican Guard, in Ba'athist Iraq
 Former Surinamese gulden, ISO 4217 code
 Stirling Radioisotope Generator, electricity generator for space applications
 Strongly regular graph, a mathematical concept
 Socialist Review Group of the UK Socialist Workers Party
 IATA airport code for Achmad Yani Airport, Semarang, Indonesia
 Spektr-RG, a Russian space observatory
 The New York City Police Department Strategic Response Group